A data control language (DCL) is a syntax similar to a computer programming language used to control access to data stored in a database (authorization). In particular, it is a component of Structured Query Language (SQL). Data Control Language is one of the logical group in SQL Commands. SQL is the standard language for relational database management systems. SQL statements are used to perform tasks such as insert data to a database, delete or update data in a database, or retrieve data from a database.

Though database systems use SQL, they also have their own additional proprietary extensions that are usually only used on their system.  For Example Microsoft SQL server uses Transact-SQL (T-SQL) which is an extension of SQL. Similarly Oracle uses PL-SQL which is their proprietary extension for them only. However, the standard SQL commands such as "Select", "Insert", "Update", "Delete", "Create", and "Drop" can be used to accomplish almost everything that one needs to do with a database.

Examples of DCL commands include:
 GRANT to allow specified users to perform specified tasks.
 REVOKE to remove the user accessibility to database object.

The operations for which privileges may be granted to or revoked from a user or role apply to both the Data definition language (DDL) and the Data manipulation language (DML), and may include CONNECT, SELECT, INSERT, UPDATE, DELETE, EXECUTE, and USAGE.

Microsoft SQL Server 
As per Microsoft SQL Server there are four groups of SQL Commands.
 Data Manipulation Language (DML)
 Data Definition Language (DDL)
 Data Control Language (DCL)
 Transaction Control Language (TCL)

DCL commands are used for access control and permission management for users in the database. With them we can easily allow or deny some actions for users on the tables or records (row level security).

DCL commands are:
GRANT  We can give certain permissions for the table (and other objects) for specified groups/users of a database.
DENY  bans certain permissions from groups/users.
REVOKE  this command takes away permissions from groups/users.

For example: GRANT can be used to give privileges to user to do SELECT, INSERT, UPDATE and DELETE on a specific table or multiple tables.

The REVOKE command is used take back a privilege (default) or revoking specific command like UPDATE or DELETE based on requirements.

Example 

GRANT in first case we gave privileges to user User1 to do SELECT, INSERT, UPDATE and DELETE on the table called employees.

REVOKE with this command we can take back privilege to default one, in this case, we take back command INSERT on the table employees for user User1.

DENY is a specific command. We can conclude that every user has a list of privilege which is denied or granted so command DENY is there to explicitly ban you some privileges on the database objects.:

Oracle Database 
Oracle Database divide SQL commands to different types. They are.
 Data Definition Language (DDL) Statements
 Data Manipulation Language (DML) Statements
 Transaction Control Statements
 Session Control Statements
 System Control Statement
 Embedded SQL Statements

For details refer Oracle-TCL         

Data definition language (DDL) statements let you to perform these tasks:
 Create, alter, and drop schema objects
 Grant and revoke privileges and roles
 Analyze information on a table, index, or cluster
 Establish auditing options
 Add comments to the data dictionary

So Oracle Database DDL commands include the Grant and revoke privileges which is actually part of Data control Language in Microsoft SQL server.

Syntax for grant and revoke in Oracle Database:

Example

Transaction Control Statements in Oracle 
Transaction control statements manage changes made by DML statements. The transaction control statements are:
 COMMIT
 ROLLBACK
 SAVEPOINT
 SET TRANSACTION
 SET CONSTRAINT

MySQL 
MySQL server they divide SQL statements into different type of statemen
 Data Definition Statements
 Data Manipulation Statements
 Transactional and Locking Statements
 Replication Statements
 Prepared Statements
 Compound Statement Syntax
 Database Administration Statements
 Utility Statements

For details refer MySQL Transactional statements

The grant, revoke syntax are as part of Database administration statementsàAccount Management System.

The GRANT statement enables system administrators to grant privileges and roles, which can be granted to user accounts and roles. These syntax restrictions apply:
 GRANT cannot mix granting both privileges and roles in the same statement. A given GRANT statement must grant either privileges or roles.
 The ON clause distinguishes whether the statement grants privileges or roles:
 With ON, the statement grants privileges
 Without ON, the statement grants roles.
 It is permitted to assign both privileges and roles to an account, but you must use separate GRANT statements, each with syntax appropriate to what is to be granted.

The REVOKE statement enables system administrators to revoke privileges and roles, which can be revoked from user accounts and roles.

Examples 

In PostgreSQL, executing DCL is transactional, and can be rolled back.

Grant and Revoke are the SQL commands are used to control the privileges given to the users in a Databases

SQLite does not have any DCL commands as it does not have usernames or logins. Instead, SQLite depends on file-system permissions to define who can open and access a database.

See also 
 Data definition language
 Data manipulation language
 Data query language

References 

Data modeling
SQL